Phtheochroa fulviplicana is a species of moth of the family Tortricidae. It is found in North America, where it has been recorded from Maine, Alberta, Nevada and California.

The wingspan is 14–23 mm. Adults have been recorded on wing from May to July and in December.

References

Moths described in 1879
Phtheochroa